Realicó is a department of the province of La Pampa (Argentina).

Villages 
 

Alta Italia
Embajador Martini

References 

Departments of La Pampa Province